Selva is a coastal comarque (county) in Catalonia, Spain, located between the mountain range known as the Serralada Transversal or  Puigsacalm and the Costa Brava (part of the Mediterranean coast). Unusually, it is divided between the provinces of Girona and Barcelona, with Fogars de la Selva being part of Barcelona province and all other municipalities falling inside Girona province. Also unusually, its capital, Santa Coloma de Farners, is no longer among its larger municipalities, with the coastal towns of Blanes and Lloret de Mar having far surpassed it in size.

Selva borders the comarques of Maresme, Vallès Oriental, Osona, Garrotxa, Gironès, and Baix Empordà.

Municipalities

References

External links

Official tourism website
Official comarcal web site (in Catalan)

 
Comarques of the Province of Girona